The Construction Holiday is the most popular time for summer vacations in Québec, Canada.

In 1970, Québec legislated an annual holiday for the construction industry that begins on the second-last Sunday of July and lasts for two weeks. The holiday officially came into effect in the summer of 1971.

Many Québécois outside the construction industry also take their holidays during then. It is thus the busiest time of year for the tourism industry, with an increase of up to 40% of visitors at some sites.

External links
 Official website

Holidays in Quebec
July observances
August observances 
Holidays and observances by scheduling (nth weekday of the month)
Sunday observances
Summer events in Canada